

Overview 

The class Flavobacteriia is composed of a single order of environmental  bacteria. Flavobacteriia are Gram-negative aerobic rods, 2–5 μm long, 0.1–0.5 μm wide, with rounded or tapered ends. Flavobacteriia are a group of commensal bacteria and opportunistic pathogens motile through gliding. This class is widely distributed in soil, fresh, and seawater habitats. The name is often spelled Flavobacteria, but officially named Flavobacteriia in 2012.

This heterotrophic bacteria heterotrophic bacteria is known for its ability to mineralize or degrade dissolved organic matter of high molecular weight and particulate plant material. They can decompose peptides and polysaccharides, excluding cellulose. They form yellow (cream to orange) colonies on agar with a G+C contents of 32–37%.

History

Origin 
Flavobacterium, was first written about in 1923 in Bergey's manual of determinative bacteriology. When it was included in the manual it only had 46 species. However, overtime the number of species included began to decrease, as a lot of them were being removed.  The reason for this was that in the beginning it was poorly defined. In the manual they are defined as gram-negative, non spore forming, aerobic, non gliding rods.  In 1999 the genus comprised species that were related to F. aquatile  A way to differentiate them is the color of their colonies which is a yellow pigment, they move by gliding and they only grow when oxygen is present. 

Flavobacterium columnare, was one of the earliest diseases discovered that affect fish, in 1922. This disease causes high mortality rates. It was first described by Davis when he discovered it in the Mississippi River.  Gradually over time the taxonomic status of the disease has changed. in 1944 it was labelled as a Myxobacteria. It was not until 1996 that it got its current name Flavobacterium columnare.

Evolution 
The genus Flavobacterium was established in 1889.

Taxonomy 

 Domain Bacteria
 Phylum Bacteroidota
 Class Flavobacteriia
 Order Flavobacteriales
 Family Crocinitomicaceae
 Family Cryomorphaceae
 Family Flavobacteriaceae
 The genus Flavobacterium is most commonly used in studies of Flavobacteriia. This genus has 100 classified species with many additional unclassified species.
 Recent taxonomic updates have reclassified several Flavobacterium species to new genera such as Microbacterium, Salegentibacter, and Planococcus.
 Family Ichthyobacteriaceae
 Family Luteibaculaceae
 Family Parvicellaceae
 Family Salibacteraceae
 Family Schleiferiaceae
 Family Vicingaceae
 Family Weeksellaceae
 Family Flavobacteriales incertae sedis
 Additionally, unclassified Flavobacteriales

Habitat 

Flavobacteriia are widely distributed with high abundances in aquatic systems. They have been found in diseased fish, microbial mats, freshwater and river sediments, seawater and marine sediments, soil, glaciers, and Antarctic lakes. They are most commonly found in Asia, specifically Korea and China, as well as Japan and India. Increases in abundance are found in areas of high organic substrate inputs due to their role in the uptake, degradation, and decomposition of organic matter and can result in bacterial dominance. Flavobacteriia is prominent in ocean sediments and decreases with increasing depth, and prefer sediments lacking vegetation.

Flavobacteriia are prominent members of marine biofilms. They have large impacts on the functioning of marine biofilms, however their abundance is believed to be heavily underestimated. These bacteria also are highly abundant in melt ponds, solid ice cores, sea ice, and brine, as well as the photic zone. More specifically, these photic zones show that Flavobacteriia are prominent in productive environments such as phytoplankton blooms and upwelling zones.

Morphology 

Flavobacteriia are a type of gram-negative rod-shaped bacteria with sizes typically ranging from 0.1μm to 0.5μm wide and 2μm to 5μm long. Depending on the species of Flavobacteriia, the genome size can range from 1.85x109 daltons to 3.9x109 daltons. Flavobacteriia are also unable to form endospores. They are classified as gram-negative due to the composition of their cell wall, which consists of a thin layer of peptidoglycan surrounded by an outer membrane composed of lipopolysaccharides. The rod-shape of these bacteria typically have straight or slightly curved parallel sides with rounded or slightly tapered ends. The overall colony morphology of Flavobacteriia exhibit a circular shape that is either convex or slightly convex with a smooth appearance. These colonies typically appear slightly translucent and can range in colour from pale yellow/cream to orange due to the presence of pigments such as carotenoids or flexirubin.

Flavobacteriia do not possess flagella and rely on either a gliding motion or are non-motile. The gliding motion allows them to move over wet surfaces such as a wet mount glass slide or agar plate. Flavobacteriia exhibit a predominant forward gliding motion, but can also reverse direction and show flipping movements . Research suggests that the gliding motion is facilitated by the proton gradient across the cytoplasmic membrane.

Metabolism 
Flavobacteriia are chemoorganotrophic, meaning they use organic molecules as a source of energy. Most species have obligately aerobic type of respiration, while some species can grow under weak microaerobic to anaerobic conditions. Flavobacteriia species that inhabit cold environments exhibit optimal growth at temperatures between 15°C to 20°C, while those that inhabit temperate environments exhibit optimal growth at temperatures between 20°C to 30°C.

Behavior 
Bacteria from the class Flavobacteriia, are able to metabolize in many different ways. They are also known as pathogens towards fish species, specifically Flavobacterium columnare which negatively impact the aquatic industry. Recently it has been discovered that flavobacteriia have proteins that efficiently discharge factors that may lead to the development of a disease.  Furthermore, Proteorhodopsin (PR) is a proton pump that uses light. Flavobacteriia can adapt to different environments to combat UV damage. Flavobacteriia that have a PR pump can utilize the light energy and therefore they are able to take on DNA that has been damaged by UV. Whereas, the Flavobacteriia that do not have a PR pump do not have the advantage of utilizing light and therefore stay away from damaged DNA.

Impacts on the Environment 

Though the majority of Flaviobacteria are harmless, some are opportunistic or actual diseases. This means they can cause disease in many types organisms such as plants or fish.

One possible disease is bacterial cold water disease caused by Flavobacterium psychrophilum in rainbow trout, which can cause tissue erosion, jaw ulcerations, inflammation, and behavioural issues. It can also cause acute losses in young rainbow trout, known as rainbow trout fry syndrome. In 2005, the National Center for Cool and Cold Water Aquaculture measured survival rate to be 29.3% from these diseases.

Additionally, Flavobacterium columare causes columnaris disease in freshwater fish species. Columnaris disease causes skin lesions, fin erosion, and gill necrosis, leading to mortality.

Flavobacteriia are key members of marine biofilms - a biological element that significantly affects the productivity and operation of marine habitats by assisting in basic microbial processes like photosynthesis, the cycling of nitrogen, and the degradation of organic matter and pollutants. In the early stage of marine biofilms formation, Flavobacteriia colonize and form microcolonies to serve as a foundation for establishing other microorganisms in a community. In the biofilms community, Flavobacteriia also engage in a variety of cooperated interactions with other microbes rather than competition, including quorum sensing, nutrient sharing and scavenging. In sum, these interactions are essential for establishing and maintaining complex microbial communities in marine biofilms.

Impacts on Human Society 
Food:

Flavobacteriia have been linked to food and food product deterioration. The atmosphere of the shop where the product is located's relative humidity affects the growth of psychrophilic or psychrotrophic microorganisms. Due to the formation of metabolic byproducts, spoilage of uncooked red flesh causes unpleasant smells, potential slime production, localized discoloration, and unwanted flavors. Similarly, while flavobacteriia are a continuous component of the initial flora in cold meats and fowl, they are unable to outcompete pseudomonads during preservation. Additionally, poultry has a much greater prevalence of flavobacteriia than other fresh flesh.

Flavobacteriia create pasteurization-resistant extracellular enzymes, which causes the psychrotrophic deterioration of milk and dairy products. Due to the creation of phospholipase C, they are also to blame for a decrease in cheddar cheese output and bitterness in milk. Given that phospholipases have the capacity to degrade the phospholipids that make up the milk fat globule membrane and thereby increase the vulnerability of the milk fat (triglycerides) to lipolytic assault, they may be significant in milk and milk products.

Disease:

The possible pathogenic nature also has the potential to cause diseases in humans. However, as strains of species in the genus Flavobacterium were reclassified, many strains that cause human disease were reclassified and transferred to new or different genera, such as Chryseobacterium, Myroides, Empedobacter, and Sphingobacterium. Their main infected populations are newborns and people with underground immunity. Neonatal infections usually manifest as meningitis, and the mortality rate of neonatal meningitis is high. Meningitis can also cause bacteremia and pneumonia. In adults, infections can manifest in a variety of ways, including pneumonia, sepsis, meningitis, endocarditis, post-surgery, and post-burn. To this point, existing pathogenic Flavobacteriia are currently very rare and difficult to detect, but remain a concern because they are resistant to many antimicrobial drugs.

References

External links
UniProt
NamesForLife

 
Bacteroidota